Sylvain Neuvel is a Canadian science fiction writer, known as the author of The Themis Files. He was born in Quebec City and raised in the suburb of L'Ancienne-Lorette. Neuvel was educated at the Université de Montréal and the University of Chicago, and runs his own professional translation agency.

The Themis Files trilogy begins with his debut novel Sleeping Giants. It follows a group of scientists, led by a physicist named Rose Franklin, as they track down and assemble a giant robot of mysterious origins, scattered across the Earth. The idea for Sleeping Giants first came to him when his son asked him to build a toy robot. Not just any toy robot, he wanted one with an extended back story, wanted to know where the robot came from and what it did. The novel is written in an atypical format, laid out in back-and-forth dialogues, journal entries and documentation rather than through traditional narration.

Neuvel first submitted the novel to literary agents in 2014 and received 50 rejections. The novel was published by Del Rey Books in 2016. It began accumulating favourable buzz after Kirkus Reviews published a rave review of the galley copy it had received. The novel, which was a longlisted contender for the 2017 edition of Canada Reads, has been optioned by Sony Pictures for development into a film and was sold for translation into twenty languages.  It was a finalist for the 2016 Goodreads Choice Awards for Best Science Fiction, the 2017 Compton Crook Award and for the Concordia University First Book Prize at the 2016 Quebec Writers' Federation Awards.

Neuvel has also been announced as one of three contributing authors on the upcoming Black Mirror book project. The first book is set to release February 2018 and will feature a collection of short fiction by each author.

Bibliography

Themis Files series 

 Sleeping Giants, Del Rey (2016)
 Waking Gods, Del Rey (2017)
 Only Human, Del Rey (2018)

 "File N°1743" (2016, short story)
 "File N°247" (2016, short story)
 "FILE NO. 002" (2017, short story)

Take Them to the Stars series 

 A History of What Comes Next, Tordotcom (2021)
 Until the Last of Me (2022)
 For the First Time, Again (Upcoming 2023)

Standalone 

 The Test, Tordotcom (2019)

References

21st-century Canadian novelists
Canadian male novelists
Canadian science fiction writers
Writers from Quebec City
French Quebecers
Living people
21st-century Canadian male writers
Canadian male non-fiction writers
1973 births
21st-century Canadian translators